Spring, Sweet Spring is a song by Julian Edwards with lyrics by Stanislaus Strange and was published in 1903 by Hearst’s Chicago American.

References 

Bibliography
Parker, Bernard S. World War I Sheet Music: 9,670 Patriotic Songs Published in the United States, 1914-1920, with More Than 600 Covers Illustrated. Jefferson, N.C.: McFarland, 2007.  

1903 songs
Songs of World War I